

Statistical leaders

Standings

American League

National League

Postseason

Bracket

Managers

American League

National League

Notable events
 July 28 - In the course of an 8-6 defeat to the St Louis Browns, Philadelphia Athletics second baseman Nap Lajoie plays his lone game in center field.

References

External links 

1916 Major League Baseball season schedule at Baseball Reference Retrieved January 14, 2018.

 
Major League Baseball seasons